IPCO may refer to:

Plinio Corrêa de Oliveira Institute
 Information and Privacy Commissioner of Ontario
Investigatory Powers Commissioner's Office
Invitation to Present Commercial Opportunities
Iran Khodro Power Train Co.